The Lecco–Milan railway is a railway line in Lombardy, Italy.

The railway line was opened on 27 December 1873 between Monza and Calolziocorte, using the existing branches from Lecco to Calolziocorte (opened in 1863) and from Monza to Milan (opened in 1840).

After the Monza-Calolziocorte, another railway connecting Monza and Lecco was built (1911, Monza-Molteno-Lecco railway), then today the first line is usually called "Milano-Lecco through Carnate", and the second "Milano-Lecco through Molteno".

See also 
 Line S8 (Milan suburban railway service)
 List of railway lines in Italy

References

Bibliography 
 Rete Ferroviaria Italiana: Fascicolo Linea 27.

External links 

Railway lines in Lombardy
Railway lines opened in 1873